Kshemal Waingankar (born 5 April 1985) is an Indian first-class cricketer who plays for Mumbai. He made his first-class debut for Mumbai in the 2006-07 Ranji Trophy on 17 December 2006.

References

External links
 

1985 births
Living people
Indian cricketers
Mumbai cricketers